Iceland–Ireland relations are the diplomatic relations between the Republic of Iceland and the Republic of Ireland. Both nations are members of the European Economic Area, Organisation for Economic Co-operation and Development and the United Nations.

History
Connections between Iceland and Ireland began circa 700s or 800s when Irish monks first explored Iceland as mentioned in the books by Irish monk and geographer Dicuil. When Norse explorers arrived to Iceland, many encountered the Irish monks on the island who they called "Papar" (papists) for the religious books they would leave behind on the island. When Norse settlers arrived, many of the Irish monks left Iceland because they would not inhabit a country of "pagans". During the following centuries, more Norse explorers would come to Iceland and bring with them Irish women and slaves to Iceland producing Iceland's current genetic make-up among its population.

During World War II both Iceland (in personal union with the Kingdom of Denmark) and Ireland remained neutral. Iceland became a republic in June 1944. On 11 March 1948, both Iceland and Ireland established diplomatic relations. In 1960, Iceland joined the European Free Trade Association while Ireland joined the European Union in 1973. In 2003, both nations signed a double taxation agreement. After the 2008 banking crisis that affected heavily the two nations, Iceland began the formal application process to join the EU; however, Ireland raised concerns over Iceland's over fishing of the mackerel which Ireland stated that Iceland fished more than its share of the fish. In 2013, Iceland pulled its application for joining the EU, wishing instead to remain outside the union.

Both nations are served with direct flights provided by airlines Icelandair and Play.

State visits

Presidential and Prime Ministerial visits from Iceland to Ireland
 President Vigdís Finnbogadóttir (1991)
 Prime Minister Geir Haarde (2007)

Presidential and Prime Ministerial (Taoiseach) visits from Ireland to Iceland
 President Mary Robinson (1991, 1996)
 Taoiseach Bertie Ahern (2001)

Trade
Both Iceland and Ireland trade under the European Single Market with Iceland belonging to the European Free Trade Association and Ireland being a full member of the European Union. In 2015, total trade between Iceland the European Union (which includes Ireland) totaled €5.7 billion.

Diplomatic missions 
 Iceland is accredited to Ireland from its embassy in London, United Kingdom.
 Ireland is accredited to Iceland from it embassy in Copenhagen, Denmark.

See also 
 Brendan
 Iceland–EU relations

References

 
Ireland
Iceland